Carl Adolf Henning (born 28 February 1809 in Berlin; died 25 March 1900 in Berlin) was a German painter.

Early life
Adolf Henning was born on 28 February 1809 in Berlin as the son of the court conductor Carl Wilhelm Henning (1784–1867). From 1823 he studied at the Berlin academy of arts under Wilhelm Wach and others. In 1833, he studied at the academy of arts in Düsseldorf in the first class under Wilhelm von Schadow as a history and portrait painter

Stay in Rome
Together with the painter Heinrich Mücke, Henning travelled to Italy from 1833 to 1835. During his time in Rome, he twice portrayed the famous model Fortunata Segatori. The oil painting in question is now in the Thorvaldsen Museum in Copenhagen, the second portrait, a drawing, in a private collection in Germany.

Later life
After his return to Berlin, he earned his living as a successful portrait painter. In 1839, he became a member and professor at the Berlin academy. Henning had been married to Marie Jordan (born 1816 in Berlin, died 1899 also in Berlin) since 1836. His brother-in-law, also his friend, was the painter Rudolf Jordan.

Museums with works by Adolf Henning (selection)
 Alte Nationalgalerie Berlin
 Neues Museum Berlin
 Berlinische Galerie Berlin
 Thorvaldsen Museum Copenhagen
 National Museum, Poznań

References

1809 births
1900 deaths
Artists from Berlin
German male painters
German portrait painters
Düsseldorf school of painting